Euan Michael Burton MBE (born 31 March 1979) is a Scottish judoka (a Judo practitioner).

Biography 
Burton was born in Ascot, Berkshire but lives in Edinburgh, he was educated at Pencaitland Primary School, Ross High School and the University of Edinburgh. He was an Individual Bursar in 1998-99 at the University.

He won the Scottish National Championship in 2000 before winning his first two championships of Great Britain, winning the half-middleweight division at the British Judo Championships in 2002 and 2003.

He won a bronze medal at the 2007 World Judo Championships before representing Great Britain at the 2008 Summer Olympics in Beijing, competing in the men's 81kg division and reaching the qaurter finals. Two years later he won a bronze medal at the 2010 World Judo Championships and in 2008, he was selected for the second time to represent Great Britain in the half-middleweight category, where he once again reached the quarter finals.

In 2012, he won his third British National title at the heavier weight of middleweight but then reverted back to half-middleweight for a third appearance at the Olympic Games. At the 2012 Summer Olympics he failed to progress from Pool D and following the Games he then concentrated his efforts as a development coach for JudoScotland.

Burton was named Scotland's flagbearer for the 2014 Commonwealth Games. At the Games, he won gold medal in the 100 kg category. He later announced his retirement and return to full-time coaching.

Burton was appointed Member of the Order of the British Empire (MBE) in the 2015 New Year Honours for services to judo.

References

External links
 
 
 
 

1979 births
Living people
Scottish male judoka
Judoka at the 2008 Summer Olympics
Judoka at the 2012 Summer Olympics
Olympic judoka of Great Britain
Sportspeople from East Lothian
Alumni of the University of Edinburgh
Members of the Order of the British Empire
Commonwealth Games medallists in judo
Commonwealth Games gold medallists for Scotland
People from Pencaitland
Judoka at the 2014 Commonwealth Games
Medallists at the 2014 Commonwealth Games